The Astronomical Society Islands are members of the Canadian Arctic Archipelago in the territory of Nunavut. They are located in western Gulf of Boothia at the mouth of Lord Mayor Bay. The group is near the Boothia Peninsula and south of the Copeland Islands.

References 

Islands of the Gulf of Boothia
Uninhabited islands of Kitikmeot Region